Gymnobela midpacifica is a species of sea snail, a marine gastropod mollusk in the family Raphitomidae.

Description
The length of the shell attains 25.3 mm.

Distribution
This marine species occurs in the Mid-Pacific, north of Midway Islands.

References

 Stahlschmidt P. & Chino M. (2012) A new species of Gymnobela (Gastropoda: Raphitomidae) from the Central Pacific. Miscellanea Malacologica 5(6): 95-98

midpacifica
Gastropods described in 2012